Paul Beleno "Bong" Alvarez (born June 15, 1968) is a Filipino retired professional basketball player of the Philippine Basketball Association. Dubbed as "Mr. Excitement" because of his high-leaping, slam-dunking acts.

Basketball career
At the young age of 17, Paul graduated from the University of Manila High School, where he was considered a star of the UM Hawklets. His playing style was noticed by San Sebastian coach Francis Rodriguez, who took him to the San Sebastian Varsity team in 1985. As a rookie, Alvarez helped the Recto-based team win their second championship in the NCAA.

In 1987, Paul was one of the college players chosen to represent the Philippine National team to the ABC Youth championships held in Manila. He then became a member of the RP Basketball team to the William Jones Cup in Taipei, the SEA games in Jakarta and ABC Championships in Bangkok. He also played for coach Derrick Pumaren and the Magnolia quintet in the Philippine Amateur Basketball League (PABL).

In his final year with San Sebastian College in 1988, Alvarez, along with league MVP Eugene Quilban, led the Stags to sweep the elimination round and then clinch the school's third NCAA title. The win erased the stigma of a bitter finals loss to Letran Knights the previous season.

PBA career
Paul Alvarez turned pro in 1989 and was drafted third overall by Alaska Milk, behind fellow national teammates Benjie Paras and Nelson Asaytono. He made an impact from his very first game delighting the crowd with his high-flying antics. Soon after, fans and TV announcers started calling him "Mr.Excitement", a moniker that stuck with him throughout his career.

In his sophomore year, Alvarez shattered the record for most points by an individual in a single-game held by Allan Caidic. He poured in 71 points in Alaska's 169-138 victory over Formula Shell on April 26, 1990. That same year, he made it to the Mythical five selection for the first time but injured his Achilles heel in Game 3 of the 1990 PBA Third Conference Finals against Purefoods. He was out of commission for two full conferences to recuperate from the Achilles heel injury but made a successful comeback in the third conference. Helping to limit the point production of Best Import Awardee Wes Matthews in the finals against Ginebra San Miguel, Alvarez and the Milkmen won their first-ever PBA championship.

A contract dispute with Alaska at the start of the 1993 PBA season led to Alvarez boarding a plane to the United States. When he returned to the country, Alaska traded him to Sta.Lucia for Bong Hawkins. He was back in harness quickly becoming one of the main men of the Realtors and was named comeback player of the year by the PBA Press Corps.

His playing career become somewhat of a journeyman from there, being traded to Shell for Romeo Dela Rosa at the start of the 1994 PBA season and then moved to San Miguel Beer in a trade with Victor Pablo in less than two years. After his one-year stint with Ginebra in 1998, Alvarez went on to play for a short stint in the Metropolitan Basketball Association before coming back to play in the PBA.

PBA career statistics

Season-by-season averages

|-
| align="left" | 1989
| align="left" | Alaska
| 59 || 31.69 || .533 || .217 || .775 || 8.1 || 2.8 || 0.9 || 0.8 || 23.0
|-
| align="left" | 1990
| align="left" | Alaska
| 55 || 41.7 || .547 || .176|| .743 || 5.7 || 2.4 || 1.0 || 1.1 || 23.4
|-
| align="left" | 1991
| align="left" | Alaska
| 14 || 27.6 || .482 || .286 || .695 || 4.2 || 1.1 || 1.1 || 0.2 || 14.5
|-
| align="left" | 1992
| align="left" | Alaska
| 30 || 42.2 || .509 || .188 || .699 || 5.8 || 4.4 || 1.5 || 1.0 || 21.3
|-
| align="left" | 1993
| align="left" | Sta Lucia
| 19 || 40.0 || .538 || .333 || .674 || 7.8 || 4.8 || 1.2 || 0.8 || 20.4
|-
| align="left" | 1994
| align="left" | Shell
| 23 || 36.1 || .549 || .167 || .650 || 6.3 || 3.9 || 1.4 || 0.5 || 16.8
|-
| align="left" | 1995
| align="left" | Shell
| 32 || 34.2 || .545 || .353 || .781 || 4.6 || 5.4 || 1.3 || 0.6 || 15.8
|-
| align="left" | 1995
| align="left" | San Miguel
| 17 || 24.2 || .563 || .000 || .565 || 3.3 || 5.7 || 0.8 || 0.8 || 11.5
|-
| align="left" | 1996
| align="left" | San Miguel
| 43 || 27.3 || .553 || .333 || .716 || 4.0 || 3.7 || 1.1 || 0.7 || 14.8
|-

| align="left" | Career
| align="left" |
| 652 || 31.0 || .468 || .203 || .676 || 6.4 || 2.4 || 0.6 || 0.7 || 11.6

Arrest
Alvarez was caught using drugs with two other individuals at a barber shop in Sikatuna village on June 3, 2017. Initially, policemen went to the barber shop to serve an arrest warrant on Alvarez for a case of slight physical injury.

Filmography

References

External links
Paul Alvarez@pba-online.net
Alvarez to play in Cebu

1968 births
Living people
Alaska Aces (PBA) draft picks
Alaska Aces (PBA) players
Barako Bull Energy players
Barangay Ginebra San Miguel players
Basketball players from Manila
Filipino men's basketball players
Philippine Basketball Association All-Stars
Philippines men's national basketball team players
San Miguel Beermen players
San Sebastian Stags basketball players
Small forwards
Shell Turbo Chargers players
Sta. Lucia Realtors players
TNT Tropang Giga players
United States Basketball League players